The 1981 FIFA World Youth Championship, the third edition of the FIFA World Youth Championship, was held in Australia from 3 to 18 October 1981. The tournament took place in six venues—where a total of 32 matches were played. Adelaide, Brisbane, Canberra, Melbourne, Newcastle and Sydney—The winner was West Germany, who beat surprise package Qatar 4–0 in a final held at Sydney Cricket Ground.

Qualification

1.Teams that made their debut.

Squads
For a list of all squads that played in the final tournament, see 1981 FIFA World Youth Championship squads.

Group stage

Group A

Group B

Group C

Group D

Knockout stage

Quarter-finals

Semi-finals

Third place play-off

Final

Result

Awards

Goalscorers

Mark Koussas of Australia won the Golden Shoe award for scoring four goals. In total, 87 goals were scored by 56 different players, with two of them credited as own goals.

4 goals

 Mark Koussas
 Taher Abouzaid
 Ralf Loose
 Roland Wohlfarth

3 goals

 Ronaldão
 Hisham Saleh
 Michael Small
 Neil Webb
 Badr Bilal
 Khalid Salman

2 goals

 Bonaventure Djonkep
 Dariusz Dziekanowski
 Romulus Gabor
 Choi Soon-Ho
 Chano
 Holger Anthes
 Jorge da Silva

1 goal

 Claudio Morresi
 Jorge Cecchi
 Juan Jose Urruti
 David Mitchell
 Ian Hunter
 Djalma Baia
 Leomir
 Paulo Roberto
 Bertin Olle Olle
 Mohamed Helmi
 Anthony Finnigan
 Geoffrey Dey
 John Cooke
 Pietro Mariani
 Agustín Coss
 González Farfán
 Ildefonso Ríos
 José Enrique Vaca
 Piotr Rzepka
 Jerzy Kowalik
 Ali Alsada
 Augustin Eduard
 Cornel Fisic
 Dorel Zamfir
 Stere Sertov
 Kwak Sung-Ho
 Lee Kyung-Nam
 Francisco López
 Jorge Fabregat
 Sebastián Nadal
 Mark Devey
 Carlos Berruetta
 Javier López Báez
 Carlos Aguilera
 Jorge Villazán
 Alfred Schön
 Martin Trieb

Own goals
 Jose Guillen (playing against Egypt)
 Jun Jong-Son (playing against Brazil)

Final ranking

Notes

External links
FIFA World Youth Championship Australia 1981 , FIFA.com
RSSSF > FIFA World Youth Championship > 1981
FIFA Technical Report

FIFA World Youth Championship
International association football competitions hosted by Australia
Fifa World Youth Championship, 1981
FIFA World Youth Championship
Fifa World Youth Championship, 1981
October 1981 sports events in Australia